A Victorian Clock Tower located in the heart of the Triangle shopping centre in Clevedon, Somerset, England. It has been designated as a Grade II listed building.

History
The clock tower was given to the town in the late 19th century by Sir Charles Elton to commemorate the Diamond Jubilee of Queen Victoria, and is decorated with Elton Ware pottery tiles, and an image of Father Time, also made from Elton Ware pottery, provided by his grandson Sir Edmund Elton, both residents of nearby Clevedon Court. At the base of the tower is a drinking fountain, but it has been out of use for many years.

References

See also
Clevedon
Clevedon Court

Buildings and structures in Clevedon
Clock towers in the United Kingdom
Clevedon
Grade II listed buildings in North Somerset
Towers completed in 1898